Bradford White Corporation, headquartered in Ambler, Pennsylvania, is an American-owned and employee owned, full-line manufacturer of residential and commercial and industrial products for water heating, space heating, combination heating and storage applications.  The Corporation’s manufacturing facilities are in Middleville, Michigan and Niles, MI, and Rochester, NH. The water heaters were patented by Gerald E White from the years 1933–1938. The company is among the largest American manufacturers of water heaters, competing with companies such as Rheem and A. O. Smith. Bradford White Corporation is made up of Bradford White Water Heaters, Bradford White – Canada, Laars Heating Systems, and Niles Steel Tank.  In each of these facilities, Bradford White focuses on hiring highly skilled engineers, craftspeople and technicians to design and produce high-quality, innovative products for professional specification and installation.

Products
The company manufacturers a full-line of water heaters to meet the needs of their customers including natural gas-, electric- (including high efficiency heat pump models), and propane models. Their portfolio includes high-efficiency and Energy Star models.  The company also offers a line of tankless water heaters, the Bradford White Water Heaters Infiniti® series of reliable and easy-to-install ENERGY STAR®-certified tankless water heaters.  In early 2022, they announced the launch of KwickShot®, a reliable and easily installed tankless electric water heater available in thermostatic and non-thermostatic models to meet a range of water temperature needs in a variety of everyday applications. They also offer a line of commercial and industrial tankless electric water heaters, powered by Keltech™.

Business model
Bradford White has a longstanding business model where its water heaters are not sold directly to consumers; Bradford White water heaters are only sold to licensed plumbers at various wholesale supply houses, and are installed in residences only via licensed plumbing services.  Bradford White claims this approach ensures proper and safe installation of its water heaters, and also prevents code violations.

Awards
2020 and 2021 ENERGY STAR® Partner of the Year Award from the U.S. Environmental Protection Agency and the U.S. Department of Energy.

In 2006, in a report by J.D. Power and Associates, Bradford White was ranked highest in subcontractor satisfaction of water heater brands.

References

External links
Official Bradford White website

Manufacturing companies based in Pennsylvania
Employee-owned companies of the United States
Companies based in Montgomery County, Pennsylvania
Manufacturing companies established in 1881
1881 establishments in Pennsylvania